"" (The Spirit of the Lord fills the universe) is a Christian hymn for Pentecost by Maria Luise Thurmair, written in 1941. First printed in 1946, it appeared with a 1609 melody by Melchior Vulpius in the German Catholic hymnal Gotteslob in 1975 as GL 249. It has been included in ecumenical hymnals and songbooks.

History 
Maria Luise Thurmair wrote "" in Innsbruck in 1941, the year of her marriage to the hymnwriter Georg Thurmair. It was then a hymn in seven stanzas about the influence of the Holy Spirit, written for the Innsbruck hymnal Gotteslob (or Innsbrucker Gesangbuch). It was published in 1946 by Christophorus, part of Herder in Freiburg. The song appeared in the Catholic hymnal Gotteslob in 1975 as GL 249, in four stanzas with a 1609 melody by Melchior Vulpius. In the current Gotteslob it is GL 347, in the section "Pfingsten – Heiliger Geist" (Pentecost – Holy Spirit). In the Protestant hymnal Evangelisches Gesangbuch of Württemberg it appears as EG-Wü 554. In the Protestant hymnal of Rheinland/Westfalen/Lippe it is EG 566. The song has been included in several songbooks, such as Alive, a ecumenical songbook for young people.

In the current Gotteslob, the hymn appears in four stanzas of seven lines. The four stanzas are in bar form, each Abgesang ending on Halleluja. The first stanza describes creation as being filled with God's spirit, filled with light and rejoicing. The second stanza notes that the Spirit awakes the spirit of visionaries and prophets. The third stanza reflects Jesus rescuing Earth ("die Erde zu erlösen"). The last stanza uses images of the spirit as storm throughout the world with a breath of fire, making God's Kingdom alive ("wird Gottes Reich lebendig").

The tune in 6/4 time is a lively dance. It was originally composed for a hymn "Lobt Gott, den Herrn, ihr Heiden all". Johann Paul Zehetbauer composed a setting for a four-part mixed choir, published by the Promultis-Verlag in Munich in 2003.

References

Bibliography

External links 
 Der Geist des Herrn erfüllt das All hansgruener.de
 Gotteslobvideo (GL 347): Der Geist des Herrn erfüllt das All katholisch.de
 Der Geist des Herrn erfüllt das All - GL 347 on YouTube

Catholic hymns in German
Hymns for Pentecost
1946 songs
20th-century hymns in German